Trail's End, or variations, may refer to:

Arts and Entertainment
 "Trail's End", a 1957 episode of American TV series Sugarfoot
 "Trail's End", a 1994 episode of The Joy of Painting with Bob Ross
 "The Trail's End" or "The Story of Bonnie and Clyde", a poem by Bonnie Parker
 Trails End, a 1949 American western film
 Trails End (1935 film), a 1935 American western film

Other uses
 Trail End, a historic home in Sheridan, Wyoming, NRHP-listed
 Trail's End (brand), a popcorn brand sold by the Boy Scouts of America and Scouts Canada
 Trail's End (Denver, Colorado), a Denver landmark 
 Trail's End Kentucky Straight Bourbon Whiskey, or simply Trail's End
 Trailsend, Kettering, Ohio, NRHP-listed in Montgomery County, Ohio

See also
 
End of the Trail (disambiguation)